Battersia is a genus of algae belonging to the family Sphacelariaceae.

The genus name of Battersia is in honour of Edward Arthur Lionel Batters (1860-1907), an English botanist and author of  "A catalogue of the British Marine algae" in 1902.

The species of this genus are found in Europe and Northern America.

Species known:
Battersia arctica 
Battersia plumigera

References

Brown algae
Brown algae genera